The Tumbatu Lighthouse (also known as the Mwana Wa Mwana lighthouse) is located on Tumbatu Island in Zanzibar, Tanzania. The lighthouse is one of the oldest lighthouses in the country and is a six-stage stone tower located on the northern tip of the island.

See also

 List of lighthouses in Tanzania

References

External links
 Photo of Lighthouse
 Tanzania Ports Authority

Lighthouses in Tanzania
Lighthouses completed in 1889
Buildings and structures in Zanzibar